Summer Hill is a historic home at Davidsonville, Anne Arundel County, Maryland.  It is a -story frame dwelling, five bays wide and two deep. It represents a typical Maryland farmhouse of the mid 19th century. The exterior is in transition between mid-19th-century style, broadly derived from Greek Revival architecture, and an earlier style derived from Federal-Georgian sources.

It was listed on the National Register of Historic Places in 1974.

References

External links

, including undated photo, at Maryland Historical Trust

Houses on the National Register of Historic Places in Maryland
Houses in Anne Arundel County, Maryland
National Register of Historic Places in Anne Arundel County, Maryland